The moose is the largest member of the deer family.

Moose may also refer to:

People
Moose (surname)
Moose (nickname)
Moose Harris (born 1967), British bass player
Moose (wrestler) (born 1984), American professional wrestler and football player
Moose (graffiti artist), pseudonym of Paul Curtis
Moose, ring name of American female professional wrestler Mickie Knuckles

Places
Moose, Wyoming, an unincorporated community
Moose Brook (New Hampshire)
Moose Falls, a waterfall in Yellowstone National Park, Wyoming
Moose Island, Maine
Moose Lake (disambiguation), a listing of places by this name
Moose Mountain (disambiguation), various peaks in the United States and Canada
Moose Pass, Alaska
Moose Pond, Maine
Moose River (disambiguation), various rivers in the United States and Canada

Science and technology
MOOSE, a proposed emergency "bail-out" system to bring a single astronaut down from orbit
Quiver diagram, known to particle physicists as a moose
Murphy Moose, a homebuilt light utility aircraft

Arts
Moose (band), an English indie rock band from the early 1990s
Moose (dog), a dog actor who played Eddie on the American sitcom Frasier
Moose, character played by John Travolta in the 2019 film The Fanatic
Moose A. Moose, the main character in the short-form television series Moose and Zee
"The Moose" (M*A*S*H), an episode of the television comedy M*A*S*H
 Moose (W-02-03), a 2003 sculpture in Chicago, Illinois
Moose: Chapters from My Life, a 2013 autobiography of songwriter Robert B. Sherman
Moose Mason, a character from the Archie Comics series

Sports teams
Toronto Canada Moose, a Canadian junior ice hockey team
Maine Moose, a Junior "A" ice hockey team
Manitoba Moose, an ice hockey team in the American Hockey League
Michigan Moose, a former ice hockey team in the All American Hockey League (2010–2011)
Trenton Moose, a 1930s basketball team based in Trenton, New Jersey

Software

Moose (Perl), an alternative object system for Perl 5
Moose (analysis), a platform for software and data analysis
MOOSE (software), an open source object oriented C++ multiphysics framework developed at Idaho National Laboratory
Moose File System, an open-source distributed file system

Radio station branding
Moose FM, a brand used by nine radio stations in Ontario
KMMS-FM, a radio station in Bozeman, Montana
WBRV-FM, a radio station in Boonville, New York
WLLG, sister station to WBRV, in Lowville, New York
WCEN, a radio station in Mount Pleasant, Michigan
WMUS, a radio station in Muskegon, Michigan

Other uses
USS Moose, the name of several U.S. Navy ships
Moose International, the Loyal Order of Moose
Moose (sternwheeler), a steamboat that operated on the Willamette River
Yakovlev Yak-11, a trainer aircraft

See also

 
 
 Letsgomoose
 Mouse (disambiguation)
 Mousse (disambiguation)
 Moosie Drier, stage name of American actor Gary Drier (born 1964)